This is a list of presidential trips made by Donald Trump during 2020 and early 2021, the final years of his presidency as the 45th president of the United States.

This list excludes trips made within Washington, D.C., the U.S. federal capital in which the White House, the official residence and principal workplace of the president, is located. Also excluded are trips to Camp David, the country residence of the president. International trips are included. The number of visits per state or territory where he traveled are:
 One visit to: Colorado, Delaware, Nebraska, Oklahoma, South Carolina and South Dakota
 Two visits to: Louisiana, Maine and Tennessee
 Three visits to: New Hampshire
 Four visits to: California, Iowa, Minnesota and New York
 Five visits to: Ohio and Texas
 Seven visits to: Arizona, Georgia, Maryland  and Nevada
 Eight visits to: New Jersey
 Nine visits to: Michigan
 Ten visits to: Wisconsin 
 Thirteen visits to: Pennsylvania
 Fourteen visits to: North Carolina
 Nineteen visits to: Florida
 Thirty-seven visits to: Virginia

January

February

March

April
No trips made.

May

June

July

August

September

October

November

December

January (2021)

See also
List of international presidential trips made by Donald Trump
List of post–2016 election Donald Trump rallies
List of presidential trips made by Donald Trump

References

2020 in American politics
2020 in international relations
2020-related lists
Lists of events in the United States
Trips, domestic